The Carver Wolverhampton Marathon is an annual marathon that is part of a series of events which constitute the Carver Marathon City Marathon Events. The other events occurring at the same time as the marathon include the Carver Wolverhampton Half Marathon, Banks's Run, Children's Run and a cycling event. The marathon is held in Wolverhampton, England in September each year. The main purpose of these events is to raise money for charity.

The marathon was first organized in 1998 by the late Roy Carver and Ian Savage, then Carver's Groups Sales Director.

The six categories cater to different participants. They are the Marathon (42.195 km), Half Marathon (21.097 km), Banks's Run (10 km), Cycling Event ( 20 km ), and the Children's Run. All events start and finish on Park Road West. The route consists of closed roads, open roads, paths and cycleways, and controlled roads. An estimated of 2,300 people participated in 2014. The event organizer is Neil Kendrick.

In 2018 the full Marathon was not run due to a lack of participants.

Past Results

Marathon

Half Marathon

Charity 

The Carver Wolverhampton City Marathon focuses mainly on supporting local charities. In total since 1998 the marathon events have raised in excess of £300.000. Charities supported in the last 4 years include:

The Carver Wolverhampton City Marathon is a registered charity.

References

Marathons in the United Kingdom
Sport in Wolverhampton